Il pentito (internationally released as The Repenter and The Squealer) is a 1985 Italian crime-drama film directed by Pasquale Squitieri. The film is loosely based on actual events involving, among others, pentito Tommaso Buscetta, judge Giovanni Falcone and banker Michele Sindona.

Cast 
Tony Musante: Vanni Ragusa
Franco Nero: Judge Falco
Max von Sydow: Spinola
Erik Estrada: Salvo Lercara
Rita Rusic: lover of Vanni Ragusa
Ivo Garrani: Boss
Marino Masè: Carabinieri Lieutenant
Tony Sperandeo: killer
Imma Piro
Claudine Auger
Marina Berti
Philippe Lemaire
Rik Battaglia

References

External links

1985 films
1980s Italian-language films
English-language Italian films
1980s English-language films
Films about the Sicilian Mafia
Films directed by Pasquale Squitieri
Films scored by Ennio Morricone
Films set in Italy
Films set in the United States
1985 crime drama films
Films à clef
1985 multilingual films
Italian multilingual films
1980s Italian films